Dagno Siaka (born 11 November 1987 in Abidjan) is a former professional footballer from Ivory Coast and He is the currently assistant manager of Thai League 1 club Muangthong United.

Honours

Club
Muangthong United
 Thai Premier League (3): 2009, 2010, 2012
 Kor Royal Cup (1): 2010
 Thai Division 1 League (1): 2008

Individual
 Thai Premier League Midfielder of the Year (1): 2013

References

1987 births
Living people
Ivorian footballers
Expatriate footballers in Thailand
Dagno Siaka
Dagno Siaka
Ivorian expatriate sportspeople in Thailand
Séwé Sport de San-Pédro players
Ivory Coast under-20 international footballers
Footballers from Abidjan
Association football midfielders